Veselin Misita (Serbian Cyrillic: Веселин Мисита; 19 March 1904 – 31 August 1941) was a Bosnian Serb military commander holding the rank of lieutenant colonel during World War II.

Misita is best known for leading the victorious Battle of Loznica in 1941 in which he was killed. Loznica became the first city in Europe liberated of fascists in August 1941.

Death and legacy
Misita was killed while leading the victorious Battle of Loznica in 1941.

Josip Broz Tito's biographer Vladimir Dedijer described Misita's death as a great loss for the uprising. On 31 August 2008, the deputy speaker of the Serbian National Assembly, Božidar Delić of the Serbian Radical Party, dedicated a plaque to Misita in the Vuk Karadžić Square in Loznica. One of the people present was the man that had applied for the plaque to be installed, Božidar Panić, who had idolised Misita in his youth, and had lit a candle for him every year.

Misita is a maternal relation to Vojislav Šešelj, whose mother's maiden name was Danica Misita.

References

External links
 Otkrivena spomen-ploča potpukovniku Misiti, pressonline.rs; accessed 24 October 2016. 

1904 births
1941 deaths
People from Mostar
People from the Condominium of Bosnia and Herzegovina
Serbs of Bosnia and Herzegovina
Royal Yugoslav Army personnel of World War II
Chetnik personnel of World War II
Yugoslav military personnel killed in World War II